Notable people and characters with the given name "Cole" include:

People

A
Cole Alexander (born 1989), South African footballer
Cole Aldrich (born 1988), American basketball player
Cole Anthony (born 2000), American basketball player
Cole Armstrong (born 1983), Canadian baseball player

B
Cole Bardreau (born 1993), American ice hockey player
Cole Bartiromo (born 1985), American blogger and convicted criminal
Cole Bassett (born 2001), American soccer player
Cole Beasley (born 1989), American football player
Cole Bennett (born 1996), American videographer
Cole Bergquist (born 1985), American football player
Cole Briggs (born 1997), New Zealand cricketer
Cole Byers (born 1983), Canadian ice hockey player

C
Cole Cassels (born 1995), Canadian-American ice hockey player
Cole Caufield (born 2001), American ice hockey player
Cole Christensen, American politician
Cole Christiansen (born 1997), American football player
Cole Conley (born 1950), American politician
Cole Croston (born 1993), American football player
Cole Cubelic, American sports analyst
Cole Custer (born 1998), American race car driver

D
Cole Dasilva (born 1999), English footballer
Cole De Vries (born 1985), American baseball player
Cole Dewhurst (born 2003), American soccer player
Cole Dickerson (born 1991), American basketball player
Cole Durham (born 1948), American educator

E
Cole Elshere (born 1989), American rodeo cowboy
Cole Escola (born 1986), American comedian and actor
Cole Escovedo (born 1981), American mixed martial artist

F
Cole Finegan, American lawyer
Cole Forbes (born 1999), New Zealand rugby union player
Cole Ford (born 1972), American football player
Cole Frame (born 2002), American soccer player

G
Cole Gardner (born 1993), American football player
Cole Garner (born 1984), American baseball player
Cole Gillespie (born 1984), American baseball player
Cole Green (baseball) (born 1989), American baseball player
Cole Gromley (born 1999), American tennis player
Cole Grossman (born 1989), American soccer player

H
Cole Hamels (born 1983), American baseball player
Cole Hammer (born 1999), American golfer
Cole Harden (born 2009), Irish racehorse
Cole Harris (born 1936), Canadian geographer
Cole Hauser (born 1975), American actor
Cole Hawkins (born 1991), American actor
Cole Hedlund (born 1995), American football player
Cole Hefner (born 1980), American politician
Cole Heppell (born 1993), Canadian actor
Cole Hikutini (born 1994), American football player
Cole Hocker (born 2001), American runner
Cole Holcomb (born 1996), American football player
Cole House (cyclist) (born 1988), American cyclist
Cole Howard (voice actor) (born 1989), Canadian voice actor
Cole Hults (born 1998), American ice hockey player
Cole Hunt (born 1994), American football player

I
Cole Irvin (born 1994), American baseball player

J
Cole Jarrett (born 1983), Canadian ice hockey player

K
Cole Kehler (born 1997), Canadian ice hockey player
Cole Keith (born 1997), Canadian rugby union footballer
Cole Kelley (born 1997), American football player
Cole Kimball (born 1985), American baseball player
Cole C. Kingseed (born 1949), American historian
Cole Kmet (born 1999), American football player
Cole Koepke (born 1998), American ice hockey player
Cole Konrad (born 1984), American mixed martial artist
Cole Kpekawa (born 1996), English footballer
Cole Krueger (born 1991), Hungarian speed skater

L
Cole Liniak (born 1976), American baseball player
Cole Luke (born 1995), American football player

M
Cole Madison (born 1994), American football player
Cole Magner (born 1982), American football player
Cole Mazza (born 1995), American football player
Cole McConchie (born 1992), New Zealand cricketer
Cole McDonald (born 1998), American football player
Cole McDonald (skier) (born 2003), American skier
Cole McKinnon (born 2003), Scottish footballer
Cole McLagan (born 1996), American soccer player
Cole McNary (born 1964), American politician
Cole Miller (born 1984), American mixed martial artist
Cole Miller (activist) (born 1956), American activist
Cole Missimo (born 1993), American soccer player
Cole Moore (born 1997), American racing driver

O
Cole Oakley (born 2000), British rugby league footballer

P
Cole Palen (1925–1993), American aircraft enthusiast
Cole Pauls, American author
Cole Pearn (born 1982), Canadian stock car racing driver
Cole Perfetti (born 2002), Canadian ice hockey player
Cole Peverley (born 1988), New Zealand footballer
Cole Plante (born 1996), American disc jockey
Cole Popovich (born 1985), American football coach
Cole Porter (1891–1964), American songwriter
Cole Pratt (born 2002), Canadian swimmer
Cole Proctor, American football coach

R
Cole Ragans (born 1997), American baseball player
Cole Riel (born 1995), American politician
Cole Rouse (born 1997), American race car driver

S
Cole Sanchez (born 1985), American artist
Cole Sand (born 2003), American actor
Cole Sands (born 1997), American baseball player
Cole Sax, American film director
Cole Schneider (born 1990), American ice hockey player
Cole Schwindt (born 2001), Canadian ice hockey player
Cole Seely (born 1990), American motocross racer
Cole Seiler (born 1994), American soccer player
Cole Sillinger (born 2003), Canadian ice hockey player
Cole Skuse (born 1986), English footballer
Cole Smith (born 1989), Canadian mixed martial artist
Cole Smith (ice hockey) (born 1995), American ice hockey player
Cole Sprouse (born 1992), American actor
Cole Sternberg (born 1979), American visual artist
Cole Stockton (born 1994), English footballer
Cole Stoudt (born 1992), American football player and coach
Cole Strange (born 1998), American football player
Cole Stratton (born 1976), American actor
Cole Shade Sule (born 1980), Cameroonian swimmer
Cole Sulser (born 1990), American baseball player
Cole Swensen (born 1955), American poet
Cole Swider (born 1999), American basketball player
Cole Swindell (born 1983), American singer

T
Cole Taylor (??–1989), American pornographic actor
Cole Tinkler (born 1986), New Zealand footballer
Cole Toner (born 1994), American football player
Cole Tracy (born 1996), American football player
Cole Trapnell (born 1982), American professor
Cole Tucker (born 1996), American baseball player
Cole Tucker (actor) (1953–2015), American pornographic actor
Cole Turner (disambiguation), multiple people

U
Cole Ully (born 1995), Canadian ice hockey player

V
Cole Van Lanen (born 1998), American football player
Cole Vosbury (born 1991), American singer-songwriter

W
Cole Walliser (born 1981), Canadian film director
Cole Walsh (born 1995), American pole vaulter
Cole Weston (1919–2003), American photographer
Cole White (born 1985), American baseball player
Cole Whitt (born 1991), American race car driver
Cole Wick (born 1993), American football player
Cole Wilcox (born 1999), American baseball player
Cole Willging (1911–1973), American football player
Cole Williams (born 1981), American actor
Cole Wilson (1922–1993), New Zealand singer-songwriter
Cole Winn (born 1999), American baseball player
Cole Wist (born 1962), American attorney and politician

Y
Cole Young (born 2003), American baseball player
Cole Younger (1844–1916), American outlaw

Fictional characters
Cole Cash, the alter ego of the superhero Grifter featured in DC Comics
Cole, from the Lego Ninjago franchise including the television series Ninjago, and the film The Lego Ninjago Movie
Cole Deschanel, in the soap opera Sunset Beach
Cole Howard, in the soap opera The Young and the Restless
Cole Thornhart, in the dramas One Life to Live and General Hospital
Cole Trickle, in the film Days of Thunder

See also
Cole (disambiguation), a disambiguation page for Cole
Cole (surname), people with the surname "Cole"
Coles (surname), people with the surname "Coles"
Coe (surname), people with the surname "Coe"
Kole (name), people with the given name "Kole"

Masculine given names
English masculine given names
English-language unisex given names